Major General Fredrick Mugisha, commonly referred to as Fred Mugisha, is a senior military officer in the Uganda People's Defence Force and assumed command over AMISOM as the fourth commander on 15 June 2011.

Recent assignments
Before replacing Major General Nathan Mugisha as commander of AMISOM he was with the Artillery Division in Masindi, Uganda. He was promoted from Brigadier to Major General shortly before taking command over AMISOM.

He currently serves as the Commandant of the newly established Counter Terrorism Center in Uganda. He was appointed to that position in May 2013. Prior to that he served as the Joint Chief of Staff of the Uganda People's Defence Forces. He was replaced, as Joint Chief of Staff, by Major General Wilson Mbadi.

Background and training
He was born in 1963 in Western Uganda. Fredrick Mugisha attended the Officer Cadet Course at Simferopol Academy in the former Soviet Union, from 1988 to 1989. He then attended the Convoy Commander Course at Monduli Military Academy in Tanzania, in 1997. In 2000, he attended the Platoon Commander Course at the Sierra Vista Military Academy in Arizona, United States of America. From 2003 until 2004, he attended the Army High Command Course at Nanjing Army Command College in China. He then attended the Africa Strategic Course at Nasser Military Academy in Egypt, in 2005. The next year, in 2006, he attended the Senior Command and Staff Course at the Army War College at Mhow, Madhya Pradesh, India, in 2006. In 2008, he attended the National Defense College, in South Africa.

Military career
General Fred Mugisha has held several positions in the Uganda People's Defense Forces, including the following:

 From 1987 to May 1988, he served as Communications Officer of a Battalion at the rank of APC.
 From 1990 to 1995, he served as Security and Combat Intelligence Officer at the rank of lieutenant
 From 1995 to 1997, he served as Second in Command of Artillery and Air Defense at the rank of captain
 From 1997 to 1998, he was the Intelligence and Security Officer of an Army Division at the rank of major.
 From 1999 to 2000, he was the Division Intelligence and Security Officer at the rank of major.
 From 2000 to 2001, he served as Director Combat Intelligence and Security at the rank of major.
 From March 2001 to December 2001, he was Deputy Chief of Military Intelligence and Security at the rank of lieutenant colonel.
 From 2002 to 2004, he was Division Operations and Training Officer at an artillery division, at the rank of colonel
 From 2005 to 2011, he was the commander of the artillery division, stationed at Masindi, at the rank of brigadier.
 In August 2011, he was promoted to the rank of major general and posted to Mogadishu, Somalia, until 2012, as the Commander of AMISOM.
 From 2012 to May 2013, he served as the Joint Chief of Staff of the Uganda People's Defence Forces at the rank of major general
 From May 2013, he was replaced as Joint Chief of Staff by Major General Wilson Mbadi and assigned to the position of commandant of the newly established National Counter Terrorism Center.

See also
 Nathan Mugisha
 Wilson Mbadi
 Uganda People's Defence Forces
 National Defence College, Kenya
 African Union Mission to Somalia

References

External links

  African Union Claims Defeat of al-Shabab In Mogadishu

Living people
1963 births
People from Mbarara District
Tanzania Military Academy alumni
Ugandan military personnel
Ugandan generals
People from Western Region, Uganda
Army War College, Mhow alumni